LG Optimus L7  is a touchscreen Android smartphone designed and manufactured by LG Electronics. First announced at the Mobile World Congress in March 2012, it is available since July. The Optimus L7 runs Android 4.1.2 Jelly bean.

Display 
LG Optimus L7 has a 4.3 inch IPS LCD display with 480x800 pixel resolution.
It has a Corning Gorilla Glass protection and has capability of multitouch.

References

See also
 LG Optimus
 List of LG mobile phones
 Comparison of smartphones

Android (operating system) devices
LG Electronics smartphones
Discontinued smartphones